Benjamin Huntington (April 19, 1736 – October 16, 1800) was an eighteenth-century American lawyer, jurist and politician from Connecticut and served as a delegate to the Second Continental Congress and as a member of the U.S. House of Representatives during the First United States Congress.

Early life and career
Huntington was born in Norwich in the Connecticut Colony, the only child of Daniel Huntington and his second wife Rachel (Wolcott) Huntington. He graduated from Yale College in 1761 and was appointed surveyor of lands for Windham County in October 1764. Huntington studied law and was admitted to the bar in 1765. He began the practice of law in Norwich. Yale College later bestowed an LL.D upon Huntington.

Huntington served as a member of the Connecticut House of Representatives from 1771 to 1780 and served as speaker of that body in 1778 and 1779. In 1775 he served on the committee of safety in the State House and was appointed to advise with Governor Jonathan Trumbull during the recess of the legislature. In 1778 Huntington was appointed a delegate to the Provincial Congress at New Haven.

From 1780 to 1784, and again in 1787 and 1788, Huntington was a member of the Continental Congress. He served on the Connecticut council of assistants from 1781 to 1789 and from 1791 to 1792. Huntington served as a member of the State Senate from 1781 to 1780 and from 1791 to 1793. When the new government went into operation in 1789, he was chosen to represent Connecticut in the First Congress of the United States as a Pro-Administration Party candidate, serving from March 4, 1789 to March 3, 1791.

On the incorporation of Norwich in 1784, he was elected its first Mayor, serving until his resignation in 1796. In 1793 he was appointed judge of the superior court of Connecticut, holding this office until 1798.

Personal life
Huntington married Anne Huntington, of Windham, Connecticut, on May 5, 1765. She died on October 6, 1790 in Norwich. Their son was named Benjamin Huntington.

Death
Huntington died on October 16, 1800 in Rome, New York and is interred in the Old Colony Cemetery in Norwich.

References

Further reading
 "The Cyclopaedia of American Biography: Comprising the Men and Women of the United States Who Have Been Identified with the Growth of the Nation V4, Volume 4" by John Howard Brown, published by Kessinger Publishing, 2006.

External links

 Biography of Benjamin Huntington by the Huntington Family Association
 
 Govtrack.us

1736 births
1800 deaths
American Congregationalists
Continental Congressmen from Connecticut
18th-century American politicians
Members of the Connecticut General Assembly Council of Assistants (1662–1818)
Members of the United States House of Representatives from Connecticut
Yale College alumni
Speakers of the Connecticut House of Representatives
Politicians from Norwich, Connecticut